Spain competed at the 1972 Winter Olympics in Sapporo, Japan.

Medalists
Francisco Fernández Ochoa won the first ever Winter Games medal for Spain.

Alpine skiing

Men

Men's slalom

Women

References
Official Olympic Reports
International Olympic Committee results database
 Olympic Winter Games 1972, full results by sports-reference.com

Nations at the 1972 Winter Olympics
1972
Olympics